Rebirth of a Feeling is the fourth album by American jazz group the String Trio of New York recorded in 1983 for the Italian Black Saint label.

Reception
The Allmusic review by Ron Wynn awarded the album 4½ stars stating "this was a unified effort. The String Trio of New York ranks as a premier outside group of the 1970s and '80s".

Track listing
 "Open Up" (James Emery) - 7:40
 "Karottenkopf" (Billy Bang) - 5:58
 "Ephemera Trilogy" (Emery) - 7:30
 "Penguins An' Other Strange Birds" (Bang) - 7:23
 "Utility Grey" (John Lindberg) - 14:00
Recorded at Barigozzi Studio in Milano, Italy on November 25 & 26, 1983

Personnel
Billy Bang - violin
James Emery - guitar
John Lindberg - bass

References

Black Saint/Soul Note albums
String Trio of New York albums
1983 albums